Swansea University F.C. is a Welsh football club, which currently plays in the Cymru South. They play at Sketty Lane, Swansea.

History
The current team was reformed as Team Swansea in 2011 by students from Swansea University. In the period since the club's reformation, the club has achieved six promotions, two Gwalia cups, one Senior Cup and two West Wales Cups, including a 10-0 win in the 2015 final.

In 2017 the club sealed the Swansea Senior League championship and West Wales Cup double in May 2017, securing their return to the Welsh Football League in a play-off against Neath & District League champions Cwm Wanderers.

In May 2018 the club was promoted to Welsh Football League Division Two as Champions. They followed this up in April 2019 by gaining promotion to the new Cymru South as runners-up in Division Two. They were also awarded the divisional fair play award for the season.

In May 2020 they were crowned champions of Cymru South after the curtailment of the season as a result of the Coronavirus pandemic.

Honours
 Cymru South Champions – 2019—20
 Welsh Football League Division Two Runners-Up - 2018–19
 Welsh Football League Division Three Champions - 2017–18
 Swansea Senior League Division One Champions - 2016–17
 Swansea Senior League Division One Runners-Up - 2015–16
 Swansea Senior League Division Two Runners-Up - 2014–15
 Swansea Senior League Division Three Runners-Up - 2013–14
 Swansea Senior League Division Four Champions - 2011–12
 Swansea Senior League Open Cup Winners- 2014–15
West Wales Intermediate Challenge Cup –  Winners (2) - 2014–15; 2016–17
 Gwalia Cup Winners (2): - 2012–13; 2013–14

Staff
 Chairman:  Ceri Jones
 Commercial: Nigel Hill
 Head of Sport: Steve Joel
 Head of Football: Dafydd Evans
 Coach: David Redfern
Source

Seasons

Notes
 1Q: First qualifying round
 2Q: Second qualifying round
 R1: First Round
 R2: Second Round
 R5: Fifth Round

University College Swansea/ Swansea University
Swansea University has a Welsh League heritage dating back to the 1960s, when under its previous guise as the University College Swansea. The University first entered the Welsh League in the 1966–67 season winning Division Two in their first season. In the 1967–68 season they finished runners-up in Division One to seal promotion to the Premier Division in just two seasons.  They were relegated at the end of the 1968–69 season but were again promoted as Division One Champions. In 1971–72 they were relegated again, remaining in Division One until 1978 when they were relegated to Division Two. The club remained in the Welsh league until 1985 when it left the league.

Honours

 Welsh Football League Division One (2nd tier Welsh Football League) Champions - 1969–70
 Welsh Football League Division One (2nd tier Welsh Football League) Runners-Up - 1967–68
 Welsh Football League Division Two (3rd tier Welsh Football League) Champions - 1966–67

Welsh Football League history
Information sourced from the Football Club History Database and the Welsh Soccer Archive.

Notes

References

Football clubs in Wales
Swansea University
Football clubs in Swansea
University and college football clubs in Wales
Swansea
Sport in Swansea
Welsh Football League clubs
Swansea Senior League clubs
Cymru South clubs